Tkuma (literally "Revival" or "Rebirth") may refer to:

Tkuma (political party), a political party in Israel
Tkuma, Israel, a moshav in southern Israel

Hebrew words and phrases